Udo Hild (18 March 1943 – 15 June 2022) was a West German rower who competed at the  1968 and 1972 Summer Olympics. In 1968 he finished in sixth place in the  double sculls event, together with Wolfgang Glock, and in 1972 he finished fourth in the  single sculls. Hild won three national titles, one in the single sculls (1970) and two in the double sculls (1968 and 1969).

References

External links
 

1943 births
2022 deaths
Olympic rowers of West Germany
Rowers at the 1968 Summer Olympics
Rowers at the 1972 Summer Olympics
West German male rowers
Sportspeople from Mainz